Ricky Van Shelton (born January 12, 1952) is an American retired country music singer. Active between 1986 and 2006, he charted more than 20 singles on the Billboard Hot Country Songs charts. This figure includes 10 Number One hits: "Somebody Lied", "Life Turned Her That Way", 'Don't We All Have the Right", "I'll Leave This World Loving You", "From a Jack to a King" (a cover of the Ned Miller hit), "Living Proof", "I've Cried My Last Tear for You", "Rockin' Years" (a duet with Dolly Parton), "I Am a Simple Man", and "Keep It Between the Lines". Besides these, seven more of his singles landed in the Top 10 on the same chart. He also released nine studio albums, of which his first four were certified platinum by the Recording Industry Association of America.

Early life
He was born at Danville Regional Medical Center in Danville, Virginia, United States, to Jenks and Eloise Shelton in 1952, but was raised in Grit, Virginia, and went to High school in Gretna, Virginia.  Although "Van" is a common portion of surnames derived from people of Dutch origin, "Van" in this case is Shelton's middle name.

Shelton's father sang gospel music while he was still a child, and from this Shelton also sang gospel, but he also liked pop music. He was soon in church, singing gospel. When he was a teenager, however, Shelton discovered country music. He soon started singing in his brother's band, singing country music, and performed at any local gathering he could.

Musical career

Move to Nashville
After he graduated from high school, Shelton started performing in area clubs and also worked a series of jobs. In 1984, Bettye Witt, his girlfriend at the time (and, since August 4, 1986, wife) found a job in Nashville, Tennessee, and Shelton went along with her. In Nashville, Shelton tried to land a deal with a recording contract, and worked in area nightclubs.  In 1986, Jerry Thompson, a newspaper columnist, heard one of Shelton's demos, and arranged an audition with Columbia Records. Soon thereafter, Shelton was offered a recording contract with CBS, with Jerry Thompson serving as his manager. In that same year, he recorded his first album, Wild-Eyed Dream. The title track was released as a single, and reached No. 24 on the Country charts.

1986–1988: Wild-Eyed Dream
Wild-Eyed Dream became successful for Shelton and his record label. The next song from the album, "Crime of Passion" gained him an even bigger hit on the Country charts, when it reached the Top 10 early that year. The follow-up was an even bigger success. This next song was called "Somebody Lied", and in December 1987 it became his first No. 1 on the Hot Country Singles & Tracks chart.  Nine other songs would make it to No. 1 on the Country charts during his career. He had a pair of other No. 1 singles from his debut album: "Life Turned Her That Way" and "Don't We All Have the Right". His album reached the No. 1 spot on the Top Country Albums chart in 1987, was one of the biggest-selling Country albums of the year, and it made Shelton one of the most successful male vocalists of that year.

1988–1989: Loving Proof
He achieved equal success the next year with a new album and a new single. The album was titled Loving Proof, and it too was a No. 1 Billboard Country album. The album spawned three No. 1 hits for Shelton. These songs were, "I'll Leave This World Loving You" (for two weeks in November 1988), "From a Jack to a King" (in March 1989), and "Living Proof" (in October 1989). "From a Jack to a King" was a remake of the original by Ned Miller. By this time in country music, Neo-Traditionalism was in its peak, and because of this, so was Shelton's career, just like so many of his counterparts, like Clint Black, George Strait, Randy Travis, and Dwight Yoakam.

1989–1991: RVS III, Christmas album and children's books
His albums continued to win him praise and keep him high on the charts. His third album was no different. Titled RVS III, this album spawned only one No. 1 single, called "I've Cried My Last Tear For You". Although this was his only No. 1 from the album, two singles came close, "Statue of a Fool" (originally recorded by Jack Greene) and "I Meant Every Word He Said", both of which reached number 2 on the Country charts. By now in his career, Shelton was one of Country music's most successful male vocalists. All his albums around this time had been certified by the RIAA as Platinum, and were also all No. 1 albums on the "Top Country Albums" chart. In 1990, he recording a Christmas album titled Ricky Van Shelton Sings Christmas.

Around the same time, Shelton wrote a series of children's books. The first two titles of his books were, Tales From a Duck Named Quacker and Quacker Meets Mrs. Moo. The series also contains "Quacker Meets Canadian Goose" and were all illustrated by Shan Williams Burklow.

1991–1992: Backroads
Shelton continued his success as the decade began to progress. The next year, 1991, proved another successful year for Shelton. He duetted on the song, "Rockin' Years" with Dolly Parton (which also went to No. 1), as well as a new album, titled, Backroads. The album featured his last No. 1 hits, along with a number 13 hit called "After the Lights Go Out". His hit streak continued up until this year, and his album was just as successful as his songs.

1992–1993: Greatest Hits Plus, Don't Overlook Salvation and alcoholism
By 1992, Shelton's success on the Country charts was tapering off and, like many others in the industry, he was swept out of popularity by the changes in country music that arrived in the early 1990s. He enjoyed one last Top 10 hit (which actually reached number 5) titled "Wild Man", which was put on his newest album, called Greatest Hits Plus. Another single, "Just as I Am", was featured on his Greatest Hits album, but it only made the Top 30 that year. He also released a gospel music album titled Don't Overlook Salvation.

In 1992, Shelton admitted that he suffered from alcoholism and sought help to recover his sobriety.

1993–1994: Love and Honor and departure from Columbia
By 1993, it was clear that Shelton was winding farther and farther away from the top ten on the Country charts. In 1994, he had his last top 40 hit with "Where Was I". After 1994's Love and Honor album, Shelton decided to leave Columbia Records.

After being under Columbia Records, Shelton was absent from the Country chart for a long period of time. However, Columbia continued to release Greatest Hits collections to the public. Shelton continued to work on other projects during this time, which did not mean giving up performing.

1997–1999: Making Plans and label formation
In 1997, Shelton formed his own label, titled RVS Records. That same year, he released his first album in three years, titled Making Plans. Shelton financed the project himself however, and worked out to release his album only to Wal-Mart stores.

2000–2001: Fried Green Tomatoes
In 2000, Shelton signed with the Audium label, where he made another album called Fried Green Tomatoes, which spawned his first single in over five years called "The Decision", but it failed to make a substantial impact on the Country chart.

2006–present: Retirement
In May 2006, Shelton announced that he would be retiring from touring to spend more time with his family.

Discography

Studio albums
 Wild-Eyed Dream (1987)
 Loving Proof (1988)
 RVS III (1990)
 Backroads (1991)
 Don't Overlook Salvation (1992)
 A Bridge I Didn't Burn (1993)
 Love and Honor (1994)
 Making Plans (1998)
 Fried Green Tomatoes (2000)

Industry awards
Academy of Country Music
1987 Top New Male Vocalist

Country Music Association
1988 Horizon Award
1989 Male Vocalist of the Year

References

External links

1952 births
Living people
American country singer-songwriters
American male singer-songwriters
Grand Ole Opry members
People from Danville, Virginia
Columbia Records artists
Singer-songwriters from Virginia
Country musicians from Virginia